The term Apulians may refer to:
 The inhabitants of the modern region Apulia in Italy.
 The tribe of the Daunians which lived in Apulia in classical antiquity.